Turricostellaria leonardhilli is a species of sea snail, a marine gastropod mollusk, in the family Costellariidae, the ribbed miters.

Description
Original description: "General shell form as for genus; shell shiny, polished, without spiral beads; color white with orange bands around mid-body; shoulder rounded; axial ribs low, rounded."

Distribution 
Locus typicus: "Off Punto Fijo, Paraguana Peninsula, Gulf of Venezuela, Venezuela."

References

Costellariidae